The Metro Purple (D Line) Extension Transit Project, formerly known as the Westside Subway Extension and the Subway to the Sea, is a construction project in Los Angeles County, California, extending the rapid transit D Line (formerly the Purple Line) of the Los Angeles Metro Rail system from its current terminus at  in Koreatown, Los Angeles, to the Westside region. The project is being supervised by the Los Angeles County Metropolitan Transportation Authority (Metro). The subway has been given high priority by Metro in its long-range plans, and funding for the project was included in two county sales tax measures, Measure R and Measure M.

The project's draft environmental impact statement was completed in September 2010, and a locally preferred alternative was selected in October 2010. Metro released the D Line (then the Purple Line) Extension's final environmental impact report in 2012. The entire project was approved at the Metro Board of Directors meeting on April 26, 2012, and construction has been separated into three sections.

This project's first, second, and third sections are under construction. Construction on Section 1, between the existing Wilshire/Western station and the planned Wilshire/La Cienega station, started on November 11, 2014. Section 2 pre-construction work between Wilshire/La Cienega station and Century City/Constellation station began in April 2017, and the official Section 2 groundbreaking ceremony took place on February 23, 2018. Section 3 advanced utility relocation pre-groundbreaking work began in February 2018 for the future  and  stations. The Section 3 groundbreaking ceremony took place on May 24, 2021.

A fourth section has long been discussed, which would extend the D Line from the Westwood/VA Hospital station 3.5 miles under Wilshire Boulevard to Santa Monica beach, terminating at or near the E Line or future Lincoln Boulevard Transit Corridor terminus.

Overview
The following new subway stations will be built:

Section 1 (2024)
 Wilshire/La Brea
 Wilshire/Fairfax
 Wilshire/La Cienega
Section 2 (2025)
 Wilshire/Rodeo
 Century City/Constellation
Section 3 (2027)
 Westwood/UCLA
 Westwood/VA Hospital

History

Early concepts
Early transit planners recognized the importance of Wilshire Boulevard as a spine and key boulevard in Los Angeles.  Early plans for regional Metro Rail envisioned a rapid-transit route between Downtown and the Westside, with a branch going north on Fairfax to Hollywood and into the San Fernando Valley. In 1961, the "New Proposed Backbone Route Plan" described a subway along Wilshire Boulevard from Westwood to Downtown (and then elevated to El Monte).  This project was never funded.  Ballot initiatives in 1968 and 1974 to build a subway to West Los Angeles were rejected by voters, but in 1980 voters passed Proposition A, which created a half-cent county sales tax to fund rail construction.  Ultimately, the Southern California Rapid Transit District (SCRTD), one of Metro's predecessors, planned a subway that would extend from Downtown Los Angeles to Fairfax Avenue, then north on Fairfax to Hollywood and the Valley.  Due to the "methane zone" (see below) that plan was modified, and Vermont Avenue was chosen for the north–south route instead of Fairfax.

Prior opposition and halt of Wilshire branch

Several factors led to the eventual halt of plans to extend the subway west along Wilshire Boulevard. For decades, the route was mired in political and socioeconomic debate, with politicians giving vent to anti-subway sentiments and NIMBY isolationism. The City of Beverly Hills also opposed the subway, as did two critical legislators from the area: Congressman Henry Waxman and Los Angeles City Councilman Zev Yaroslavsky.

Following a methane explosion in 1985 at a Ross Dress for Less clothing store near Fairfax and Third Street, Congressman Waxman worked to legally designate a large part of Mid-Wilshire as a "methane zone." This zone stretched on either side of Wilshire Boulevard from Hancock Park to the west of Fairfax (through areas of his district where subway opposition was strongest). Waxman was able to pass federal legislation banning all tunneling through this zone. Subsequently, any plans for a subway west of Western Avenue diverted the line south around the methane zone, using Crenshaw, Pico, and San Vicente Boulevards. These plans never came to fruition, and to qualify for federal funding, the SCRTD instead started anew and rerouted the subway north on Vermont Avenue, then traveling west under Hollywood Boulevard and then north toward the Valley. The Red Line was completed in 2000.

The Red Line project (which includes both of the present-day B Line and D Line corridors) began in 1986. Soon after construction began, the project began to draw a considerable amount of bad press. Access to many local businesses was blocked for weeks, causing some small businesses to shut down.  Disagreements arose between Metro and Tutor-Saliba (general contractor on the project) over tens of millions of dollars in cost overruns. A sinkhole in Hollywood seemed to symbolize the disastrous nature of the subway project. As a result, in 1998, voters approved a measure sponsored by County Supervisor Yaroslavsky that banned use of Proposition A and Prop C sales tax funds for any subway tunneling in the county. This effectively ended any chance of a Westside Subway in the foreseeable future.

Wilshire/Western is presently the western terminus of the D Line.

New support and approval
In 2000, an urban art group called Heavy Trash placed signs advertising a fictional "Aqua Line." The signs, with the text "Coming Soon," showed a subway route extending along Wilshire to the ocean, with 10 station stops. Although the campaign was a hoax, it demonstrated newfound support and revealed the frustrations surrounding the lack of a subway connecting Santa Monica and the Westside with Downtown Los Angeles. The name "Aqua Line" was later repurposed as the proposed name for the Expo Line.

During the 2000s, support for the subway began to materialize, largely due to the massive impact of traffic on Wilshire Boulevard and throughout the region. The Metro Rapid bus line that currently operates along Wilshire Blvd. runs at capacity. In 2005, Los Angeles voters elected Antonio Villaraigosa mayor of Los Angeles. In his campaign and after the election, Villaraigosa declared an extension of a subway line to Santa Monica a major priority, offering visionary slogans such as "subway to the sea," "the most utilized subway in the nation, maybe the world," and "the most cost-effective public-transportation project in America." As mayor, Villaraigosa served several one-year-long terms as Metro Board chairman.

In December 2005, Congressman Henry Waxman, who had sponsored the "methane zone" tunneling ban 20 years earlier, championed the reversal of his legislation upon a committee's assertion that tunneling through the methane zone was now safe. To make this happen, Waxman introduced new congressional legislation (H.R. 4653 ) to overturn the ban.

In July 2006, the Metro board approved staff and funding to initiate a Major Investment Study (MIS) to study the corridor west of Western Avenue for a possible subway extension. In the following month, the Metro Board voted to designate the Wilshire branch of the Red Line, between Union Station and Wilshire/Western Station, as the Purple Line.

With a new name and a new study initiated, the Purple Line Extension began to receive public support from several organizations. In 2006, the Westside Cities Council of Governments endorsed the extension. In September 2006, both Cedars-Sinai Medical Center and UCLA joined the council's Mass Transit Committee to advocate for the subway extension. In 2007, the Beverly Hills City Council endorsed a Wilshire alignment that includes one station at the corner of Wilshire and La Cienega boulevards and another on Wilshire Boulevard between Beverly Drive and Rodeo Drive.

On June 28, 2007, the Metro board approved a $3.6 million contract with Parsons Brinckerhoff to provide an Alternatives Analysis (AA), an assessment of tunnel feasibility, and conceptual engineering with options for future preliminary engineering and environmental clearance for this extension.

Congressmember Henry Waxman's legislation to lift the ban on tunneling through the "methane zone" finally became law in December 2007 as part of the 2008 omnibus spending bill. The passage of this long-awaited legislation allowed, for the first time in two decades, the planning and building of a westward extension of the subway.

In 2009, the Wilshire Subway Extension was included in Metro's Long Range Transportation Plan, and environmental studies were begun.

Environmental review process

Initial alternatives analysis

During the alternatives analysis, many alternatives were considered. These included different alignments and several modes of transit (heavy rail, light rail, bus rapid transit and monorail). Most alignments were variations/combinations of two primary alignments: the "Wilshire alignment" and the "West Hollywood alignment."

 The Wilshire alignment has been suggested as a corridor to the Westside for decades. Wilshire Boulevard has many destinations along its path, including Miracle Mile, Beverly Hills and Century City. The route heads west from  primarily along Wilshire Boulevard until it reaches Santa Monica Boulevard. At that point, the route diverts through Century City before returning to Wilshire in Westwood.
 The West Hollywood alignment (sometimes known as the "Pink Line") was proposed during the public scoping process. The route travels along Santa Monica Boulevard and San Vicente Boulevard, connecting  in the north to the Wilshire route in the south. The West Hollywood route generated considerable support from the public, transit advocates, and the City of West Hollywood.

Other alignments studied involved various deviations from Wilshire Boulevard to allow service to destinations such as Beverly Center, Cedars-Sinai Medical Center, and Farmers Market.

The alternatives analysis recommended further study on four alternatives: "No Build," TSM (Transportation Systems Management), the Wilshire Alternative, and a combination Wilshire/West Hollywood Alternative. Both build alternatives use heavy rail (HRT) as their transit mode, primarily because this would allow interconnection to the existing Metro Rail subway system.  All proposed alignments involving other transit modes (monorail, LRT, and BRT) were eliminated.

DEIR alternatives
The five alternatives considered in the Draft Environmental Impact Report are:

Alternatives 3 and 5 are the build alternatives carried over from the alternatives analysis (AA).  In addition, three new alternatives (Alternatives 1, 2, and 4) were added.  These new alternatives are variations of the two AA-recommended alternatives which all stop short of Santa Monica.  They were added to reflect the realities of limited available funds and the priorities in Metro's Long Range Transportation Plan (LRTP).

The following table shows all potential metro stations and the alternatives for which they apply:

In addition to the five build alternatives, the DEIR identified six sets of options:

Route Selection: Alternative 2
In September 2010, Metro published the project's draft environmental impact statement.  The report made no specific recommendation among the five alternatives.  However, Metro staff did signal that only Alternatives 1 and 2 would be serious candidates for the Locally Preferred Alternative since only those two alternatives match the project scope defined in Measure R and Metro's Long Range Transportation Plan (LRTP).

In October 2010, Metro staff recommended continuing the study on Alternative 2. Staff also recommended:

 Crenshaw Station: delete.
 Wilshire/Fairfax Station: build east station option.
 La Cienega Station: build east station option.
 West Hollywood Connection Structure: delete.
 Century City Station:
 continue to study both Santa Monica and Constellation station options.
 continue to study Constellation North and Santa Monica alignment options between Beverly Hills and Century City.
 continue to study only the East alignment option between Century City and Westwood.
 Westwood/UCLA Station: continue to study both Wilshire/Westwood and Wilshire/Gayley station options.
 Westwood/VA Hospital Station: continue to study both VA Hospital North and VA Hospital South station options.
 Storage and Maintenance Facility: expand existing Division 20 facility.

In eliminating the West Hollywood Connection Structure, Metro staff eliminated the future possibility of a West Hollywood line as a heavy-rail branch of the Wilshire Subway, as described in Alternatives 4 and 5. Staff cited the $135 million cost and lower-than-expected performance and cost-effectiveness.  Staff left open the possibility of other future alternatives which would not require a connection structure, such as light rail, with a possible future extension south of Wilshire on San Vicente Boulevard, connecting to a future extension of the K Line currently being built that would run north of Exposition Boulevard.

Due to protests from Beverly Hills residents and local officials, the Metro Board approved an amendment requesting a detailed study and comparison of the two Century City station options in the FEIR. Metro eventually chose the Century City station location of Constellation Boulevard and Avenue of the Stars intersection, displeasing Beverly Hills and its school district as the route traveled under Beverly Hills High School. They preferred the Santa Monica Boulevard and Avenue of the Stars intersection. Metro argued earthquake faults and abutting a golf course made the location undesirable and would be under-served. After legal battles and court hearings, Metro prevailed, proving the DEIR was correct. At the Metro Board meeting in late October 2010, the Metro Board certified the DEIR and accepted the staff recommendation as the Locally Preferred Alternative (LPA). A Metro presentation dated October 29, 2013, shows the approved route to the Westwood Veteran's Administration Medical Center and the Section 1 segment to La Cienega had commenced. This presentation also shows construction methods and timelines for all three sections.

Project budget and planning
The project's estimated costs have increased since it was first proposed in the 1950s. Metro proposed Measure R in 2008; estimated costs in 2008 exceeded Metro's funds available, so they decided to promote the passage of heavy rail to Westwood and dropped the use of the locally used term "Subway to the Sea". This was done to lower costs, raise public awareness to help pass measure R, cover central LA, and connect Century City to downtown LA. The Expo Line to Santa Monica beach was under construction then, and Metro didn't want to promote two lines to Santa Monica as they needed countywide support for passage.

Metro estimated in the late 2000s the entire project would cost $4.2 billion (2008 dollars). After the passage of the Measure R sales tax in 2008, an additional $4.074 billion was added to its construction funds. In 2016, LA county voters passed Measure M and funds were appropriated to accelerate the project.

Metro estimates that the three-section project, adding 9 miles of track and 7 new stations, will cost $8.2 billion. Metro has received over half of its funds from "New Starts" grants and low-interest loans from the federal government.

According to the accelerated schedule after measure M, the full extension would ultimately be opened in three segments as follows:

 2023: open to La Cienega;
 2025: open to Century City/Constellation;
 2026: open to Westwood/VA.

Funding is being sought to accelerate the project's timeline further as officials prefer to open all stations before the start of the 2028 Summer Olympics and Paralympic Games, which Los Angeles will host.

Opposition 
BHUSD Board of Education President Lisa Korbatov objected to the placement of the subway tunnel underneath Beverly Hills High School between the Wilshire/Rodeo and Century City/Constellation stations, noting that the district had planned to construct new buildings and a below-ground parking lot precisely where the tunnel would impact the high school's property.

Metro chose a route placing the Century City/Constellation station at Constellation Boulevard instead of Santa Monica Boulevard due to lower ridership projections adjacent to the Los Angeles Country Club and an earthquake fault zone in the latter area. Korbatov claimed that Metro did not adequately study the route to the Constellation Boulevard station and said it could pose a safety risk to students, citing no sources. She also pointed out that the subway tunnel would prevent BHUSD from carrying out many of its long-range construction plans. The school district and city filed a lawsuit in July 2012 against Metro.

In April 2014, Los Angeles County Superior Court Judge ruled that Metro had properly conducted environmental studies under the California Environmental Quality Act. A transit hearing under the requirements of the Public Utilities Code. BHUSD and Beverly Hills interest groups, after spending $10 million on the lawsuit through August 2017, lost the appeal to prevent Metro from contracting with the FTA for the subway project. The school district and city appealed the decision to the California Court of Appeals and lost again, with the court citing that Metro complied.

On January 26, 2018, BHUSD again submitted a lawsuit against the FTA and Metro for them to conduct another environmental study for health reasons and prohibit the FTA from granting federal funds to the Project until the agencies have fully complied with federal law. BHUSD alleged in June 2018 that Purple Line construction in Century Park East property is affecting their property. Metro responded they are complying with their compact agreement made before construction. Metro's response to the new lawsuit stated they have complied and the supplemental environmental in Beverly Hills and the Century City/Constellation station meets all legal requirements. That additional analysis confirms they can safely build the project, including the portion beneath Beverly Hills High School. As recently as October 2018, Lisa Korbatov and other members of the BHUSD maintained the district is continuing their litigious action against Metro and the Purple Line Extension construction project. In June 2019, the lawsuit was placed on hold by a local district court judge. No actions were taken, stating it is in "Abeyance." BHUSD is requesting mediation. Metro has declined mediation in the past, citing they have always complied with the DEIR/EIR results and previous environmental review studies added by the courts. In May 2020, the courts again sided with Metro, citing that "Metro satisfied the obligation and that their determination was not arbitrary or capricious," ending the lawsuit. Work continues on the subway extension, and Metro reports it has not affected their timeline for completion. They report that it is "on time and on budget."

Lisa Korbatov is now a Republican lobbyist for BHUSD and, per reports, has now spent over $16 Million in school tax bonds to sue Metro.

Construction

Section 1

In July 2014, a joint venture by Skanska, Traylor and J.F. Shea Co. was selected by the Metro board, in a 9 to 3 vote, as the winner of the $1.6 billion contract for Section 1. Skanska was selected over a competing bid by Dragados that was $192 million lower because of Skanska's experience building other Los Angeles transportation projects, like the Expo Line and the Regional Connector.

Groundbreaking occurred for Section 1 of the extension in November 2014. The  segment will cost $2.8 billion: the federal government will provide a $1.25 billion "New Starts" grant and an $856 million infrastructure loan, with the remainder of the budget from Measure R funds. When complete, each station will have a ridership of around 62,000 on weekdays. Twin Herrenknecht boring machines "Soyeon" and "Elsie" began digging the  section in the fall of 2018 from the La Brea Station to Wilshire/Western station. Soyeon arrived at Wilshire/Western in June 2019, marking the halfway point of Section 1. The TBMs were then returned to Wilshire/La Brea to head west to Wilshire/La Cienega.

Section 2
In January 2017, Section 2 of the project, which will extend trackage  further to Century City, was awarded a $1.6 billion grant from the Federal Transit Administration, covering the majority of the $2.6 billion estimated cost of the project. Federal funding was secured through the last months of the Obama Administration and local funds with the passage of Measure M. On January 27, the Metro board awarded a $1.37 billion construction contract to a joint venture between Tutor Perini and O&G Industries, with construction scheduled to be completed by 2025. Section 2 was given notice to proceed in April 2017 by Metro to Tutor/O&G and it began the pre-construction phase. Major work at the planned Wilshire/Rodeo Station in Beverly Hills began at the end of 2018. The official groundbreaking ceremony for Section 2 took place on February 23, 2018. The twin boring machines were introduced as Ruth Bader Ginsburg and Harriet Tubman and delivered on June 17, 2019, to the Century City/Constellation station staging site where they headed east to the Wilshire/La Cienega station and reached the Wilshire/Rodeo station early 2022. Due to COVID-19 pandemic stay-at-home orders, Metro was able to fast-track the piling and decking of Wilshire/Rodeo station from a January 2021 completion to a June 2020 completion.

Section 3
The $410 million tunneling contract was announced to the joint bid of Frontier-Kemper and Tutor Perini JV for the  twin tunnels construction portion and the $1.8 billion contracts with Tutor Perini for the "design/build" of stations. These two stages were contingent on receiving the final federal full funding grant agreements (FFGA) approved by Congress in 2016. Advance utility relocation began in February 2018 for the future Westwood/UCLA station. While federal funding for Section 3 had already been approved in 2016, there were some delays from the Trump Administration in issuing funds.

Metro needed "Letters of No-Prejudice" from the USDOT FTA for tunneling before October 2018, as it would have delayed the project's approved schedule. Metro would have had to reissue the contract. USDOT finally issued the letter to proceed in September 2018. It also issued $491 million in starting grants, along with $100 million in November 2018 and another $100 Million in July 2019 of the FFGA. With these amounts received, Metro and Frontier-Kemper/Tutor Perini JV proceeded on an expedited tunneling schedule and commenced construction.

In February 2019, Metro approved the project's overall $3.6 billion budget and officially awarded contractor Tutor Perini the design/build contract. In April 2019, Metro received a second "letter of no prejudice" from the FTA for the construction of stations, testing, and track work. Metro received its twin boring machines for Section 3, The names “Aura” and “Iris” were chosen from entries submitted by veterans and Veterans Affairs employees as well as UCLA students, alumni, and employees. In February 2020, Metro received its total, and final FFGA of $1.3 billion "New Starts" grants. Construction work continues on an accelerated schedule in time to open by 2027. A groundbreaking ceremony was held for Section 3 on May 25, 2021. They began tunneling east from the Westwood/VA Hospital station.

References

Further reading

 Christopher Hawthorne (September 27, 2006) "Finally, on the right track",  Los Angeles Times
 Jean Guccione (November 27, 2006) "Beverly Hills doesn't want to miss the subway", Los Angeles Times
 Richard Simon (February 8, 2007) "House votes to repeal law blocking subway construction on L.A.'s Westside", Los Angeles Times
 Ari Bloomenkatz (July 14, 2007) Subway to the Sea' plan still adrift", Los Angeles Times
 Rong-Gong Lin II (November 3, 2007) "Subway planners take sharp turn", Los Angeles Times
 Alan MittelStaedt (December 27, 2007) "L.A. Sniper: Subway Fibs and Felonies", Los Angeles City Beat

External links
 D Line Extension project – official Metro website

.
Los Angeles Metro Rail projects
Proposed railway lines in California
Wilshire Boulevard
2027 in rail transport
2025 in rail transport
2024 in rail transport